The 2012 Croatian Cup Final was a two-legged affair played between Dinamo Zagreb and Osijek. 
The first leg was played in Osijek on 2 May 2012, while the second leg on 9 May 2012 in Zagreb.

Dinamo Zagreb won the trophy with an aggregate result of 3–1.

Road to the final

First leg

Second leg

References

External links 
  

2012 Final
GNK Dinamo Zagreb matches
NK Osijek matches
Cup Final